This is a list of launches made by the Proton rocket between 1965 and 1969. All launches were conducted from the Baikonur Cosmodrome. The list includes the first five launches, which were conducted under the designations UR-500 and UR-500K, before the selection of the name Proton.

Launches

| colspan="6" |

1965

|-

| colspan="6" |

1966

|-

| colspan="6" |

1967

|-

| colspan="6" |

1968

|-

|colspan=6|

1969

|-

|}

References

Universal Rocket (rocket family)
Proton1965
Proton launches